The longnose velvet dogfish (Centroselachus crepidater) is a sleeper shark of the family Somniosidae, found circumglobally in southern hemisphere subtropical seas, at depths of between 230 and 1,500 m. It reaches a length of 130 cm.
It has a diet consisting of predominantly mesopelagic fishes and squids.

Conservation status 
The New Zealand Department of Conservation has classified the longnose velvet dogfish as "Not Threatened" with the qualifier "Secure Overseas" under the New Zealand Threat Classification System.

References

longnose velvet dogfish
Fish of the East Atlantic
Marine fish of Eastern Australia
Fish of Chile
Fish of Japan
Fish of Namibia
Marine fish of New Zealand
longnose velvet dogfish